Overclocked: A History of Violence is a psychological thriller adventure game developed by House of Tales and published by Lighthouse Interactive. It was released on April 21, 2008 for retail and direct download.

Story
The game, thematically about the effect and aftermath of violent acts, is about US Army psychiatrist David McNamara who is treating several mentally-scarred teen patients, during a violent thunderstorm in New York City.

Plot
The game begins when five amnesic college-aged teens suddenly appear with guns in the middle of New York City. Psychiatrist David McNamara from DC is sent to examine the case thanks to his previous work in the US Army dealing with post-traumatic stress disorder. Right from the beginning, the case seems odd. On the first day, David discovers that all five patients had the same origins, and they were escaping from the same unknown person from an isolated military island. As the history is revealed, David, using a PDA as a tape recorder, makes his way through the teens' minds, piecing together their history, while at the same time dealing with his ongoing divorce. David himself has serious issues regarding anger management, which ended his former relationship.

It is revealed in the end that the teens were part of a military experiment for making amnesic assassins, and David's anger issues were only side effects of the previous project back in the Army.

Production
House of Tales is a German game development studio founded by Martin Ganteföhr and Tobias Schachte. Ganteföhr served as both the writer and the creative director for the game. In a 2008 interview, he expresses his reasons for choosing such an intense topic (violence / psychology of aggression) as the theme for the game: "I chose the topic because it interests me, and is at least as worth to dedicate a game to as War on Mars. You see, making games is a very personal process for me. I have many questions about life, and as long as somebody is willing to listen, I will try to convey my thoughts and feelings in my games."

Reception

Domestic

International

Overclocked received mixed reviews from English-language publications. Brett Todd in his 7.5/10 review for GameSpot favorably regarded the game's "deep, engaging story with lifelike characters and dialogue" but noted its nihilistic tone. IGN's 7/10 review also noted the game's "haunting main theme... and gloom of rainy New York [which] adds an appropriate layer of anxiety to the experience." It also received a Recommended award at IT Reviews, who enjoyed its "strong characters" and "engrossing storyline." PC Gamer scored it a 48% in its negative review, stating that "Unless you're jonesing for an adventure game fix, your time's better spent rearranging your Netflix queue."

See also
Ankh: Battle of the Gods
Sherlock Holmes: The Awakened

References

External links

Awards

2008 video games
House of Tales games
Point-and-click adventure games
Video games developed in Germany
Video games set in the 2000s
Video games set in New York City
Windows games
Windows-only games
Lighthouse Interactive games
Single-player video games